Mount Adnah Cemetery is a historic rural cemetery located at Fulton in Oswego County, New York.  It was designed in 1853 and within the boundaries of this contributing site are two contributing buildings (superintendent's house and barn), 10 contributing structures, and five contributing objects. Notable burials include M. Lindley Lee (1805–1876) and Albert Lindley Lee (1834–1907).

It was listed on the National Register of Historic Places in 2001.

References

External links
Mount Adnah Cemetery – Fulton, NY – U.S. National Register of Historic Places on Waymarking.com
 

Cemeteries on the National Register of Historic Places in New York (state)
Cemeteries in Oswego County, New York
National Register of Historic Places in Oswego County, New York
Rural cemeteries